Francesco Postiglione (born 29 April 1972 in Naples) is a former swimmer and water polo player from Italy, who represented his native country at four Summer Olympics: 1992, 1996, 2000 and 2004. At his Olympic debut he competed as a breaststroke swimmer (1992). Four years later he claimed the bronze medal with the men's national team at the 1996 Summer Olympics in Atlanta, USA.

See also
 List of Olympic medalists in water polo (men)
 List of World Aquatics Championships medalists in water polo

References
 RAI Profile

External links
 

1972 births
Living people
Swimmers from Naples
Italian male swimmers
Italian male water polo players
Swimmers at the 1992 Summer Olympics
Water polo players at the 1996 Summer Olympics
Water polo players at the 2000 Summer Olympics
Water polo players at the 2004 Summer Olympics
Olympic swimmers of Italy
Olympic water polo players of Italy
Olympic bronze medalists for Italy
Olympic medalists in water polo
World Aquatics Championships medalists in water polo
Medalists at the 1996 Summer Olympics
Swimmers of Centro Sportivo Carabinieri
Water polo players from Naples